Lorraine Ann Hine (born May 1, 1930) is an American former politician in the state of Washington. She served the 33rd district from 1981 to 1993.

References

Living people
1930 births
People from Dewey County, South Dakota
Women state legislators in Washington (state)
Democratic Party members of the Washington House of Representatives
21st-century American women